The communal section (formerly section rurale) is the smallest administrative division in Haiti. The 144 communes are further divided into 571 communal sections.

Operation 

It is headed by an executive body, the CASEC (Board of Communal Section) and a deliberative body, ASEC (Assembly of the Communal Section).

These two institutions are aided by CDSC (the Development Council of the Communal Section).

Within each, there are cities or neighborhoods, communities, habitations, and  lakou  with sometimes difficult to grasp distinctions.

List of communal sections of Haiti

Desdunes
Desdunes

Dessalines
Villard
Fosse Naboth ou Duvallon
Ogé
Poste Pierrot
Fiéfé ou Petit Cahos
ll Croix ou Grand Cahos

Grande-Saline
Poteneau

Petite Rivière de l'Artibonite
Bas Coursin I
Bas Coursin II
Labady
Savane à Roche
Pérodin
Médor

Ennery
Savane Carrée
Passe-Reine ou Bas d'Ennery
Chemin Neuf
Puilboreau

L'Estère
La Croix-Perisse
petite-Desdunes

Gonaïves
Pont Tamarin
Bassin
Rivière de Bayonnais
Poteaux
Labranle

Anse-Rouge
L'Arbre
Sources Chaudes, Anse-Rouge

Gros-Morne
Boucan Richard
Rivière Mancelle
Rivière Blanche
L'Acul
Pendu
Savane Carrée
Moulin
Ravine Gros Morne

Terre-Neuve
Doland
Bois Neuf
Lagon

Marmelade
Crête à Pins
Bassin ou Billier
Platon

Saint-Michel-de-l'Atalaye
Platana
Camathe
Bas de Sault
Lalomas
L'Ermite
Lacedras
Marmont
L'Attalaye

La Chapelle
Martineau
Bossous

Saint-Marc
Délugé
Bois Neuf
Goyavier
Lalouère
Bocozelle
Charrette

Verrettes
Belanger
Guillaume
Désarmes
Bastien
Terre Natte

Cerca-la-Source
Acajou Brûlé
Lamielle

Thomassique
Matelgate
Lociane

Cerca-Carvajal
Rang

Hinche
Juanaria
Marmont
Aguahédionde (Rive Droite)
Aguahédionde (Rive Gauche)

Maïssade
Savane Grande
Narang
Hatty

Thomonde
Cabral
Tierra Muscady
Baille Tourrible
La Hoye

Belladère
Renthe Mathe
Roye-Sec
Riaribes

Lascahobas
Petit Fond
Juampas

Savanette
Savanette (Colombier)
La Haye

Boucan-Carré
Petite Montagne
Boucan Carré
Bayes

Mirebalais
Gascogne
Sarazin
Grand-Boucan
Crête Brûlée

Saut-d'Eau
Canot ou Rivière Canot
La Selle
Coupe Mardi Gras
Montagne Terrible

Anse-d'Hainault
Grandoit
Boudon
Ilet à Pierre Joseph
Mandou

Dame-Marie
Bariadelle
Dallier
Desormeau
Petite Rivière
Baliverne

Les Irois
Matador (Jorgue)

Beaumont
Beaumont
Chardonnette
Mouline

Corail
Duquillon
Fond d'Icaque
Champy (Nan Campêche)
Rimbeau

Pestel
Bernagousse
Espère
Jean Bellune
Tozia
Duchity
Les Cayemites

Roseaux
Carrefour Charles ou Jacqui
Fond Cochon ou Lopineau
Grand Vincent
Les Gommiers

Abricots
Anse du Clerc
Balisiers
Danglise
La Seringue

Bonbon
Desormeau ou Bonbon

Chambellan
Dejean
Boucan

Jérémie
Basse Voldrogue
Haute Guinaudée
Basse Guinaudée
Ravine à Charles
Iles Blanches
Marfranc ou Grande Rivière
Fond Rouge Dahere
Fond Rouge Torbeck

Moron
Anote ou 1ère Tapion
Sources Chaudes
L'Assise ou Chameau

Anse-à-Veau
Baconnois-Grand-Fond
Grande-Rivière-Joly
Saut du Baril

Petit-Trou-de-Nippes
Raymond
Tiby
Liève ou Vigny

L'Asile
L'Asile ou Nan Paul
Changeux (Quartier de Changeux)
Tournade (Quartier de Changeux)
Morrisseau

Arnaud
Baconnois-Barreau
Baquet
Morcou

Plaisance-du-Sud
Plaisance du Sud (ou Ti François)
Anse-aux-Pins
Vassal Labiche

Baradères
Gérin ou Mouton
Tête d'Eau
Fond Tortue
La Plaine
Rivière Salée

Grand-Boucan
Grand-Boucan
Eaux Basses

Miragoâne
Chalon
Belle-Rivière
Dessources
Saint-Michel-du-Sud

Petite-Rivière-de-Nippes
Fond des Lianes
Cholette
Silègue
Bezin

Fonds-des-Nègres
Bouzi
Fond-des-Nègres ou Morne Brice
Pemerle
Cocoyers-Ducheine

Paillant
Salagnac
Bezin II

Acul-du-Nord
Camp Louise
Bas de l'Acul (Basse Plaine)
Mornet
Grande Ravine
Coupe à David
Soufrière (Acul-du-Nord)

Milot
Perches de Bonnet
Bonnet à l'Evèque
Genipailler

Plaine-du-Nord
Morne Rouge
Basse Plaine
Grand Boucan
Bassin Diamant

Borgne
Margot
Boucan Michel
Petit-Bourg-de-Borgne
Trou d'Enfer
Champagne
Molas
Côte-de-Fer et Fond

Port-Margot
Grande Plaine
Bas Petit Borgne
Corail
Haut Petit Borgne
Bras Gauche

Cap-Haïtien
Bande-du-Nord
Haut-du-Cap
Petit-Anse

Limonade
Basse Plaine
Bois de Lance
Roucou

Quartier-Morin
Basse Plaine
Morne Pelé
Bois-Gradis

Bahon
Bois Pin
Bailly ou Bailla
Montagne Noire

Grande-Rivière-du-Nord
Grand Gilles
Solon
Caracol
Gambade
Joli Trou
Cormiers

Bas-Limbé
Garde Champètre (Bas Limbé)
Petit Howars (la Fange)
Petit Howars (la Fange)

Limbé
Haut Limbé ou Acul Jeanot
Chabotte
Camp-Coq
Soufrière (Limbé)
Ravine Desroches
Ilot-à-Corne

Pilate
Ballon
Baudin
Ravine-Trompette
Joly
Dubourg
Piment
Rivière Laporte
Margot

Plaisance
Gobert ou Colline Gobert
Champagne
Haut Martineau
Mapou
La Trouble
La Ville
Bassin
Grande Rivière

Dondon
Brostage
Bassin Caïman
Matador
Laguille
Haut du Trou

La Victoire
La Victoire

Pignon
Savannette
La Belle Mère

Ranquitte
Bac à Soude
Bois de Lance
Cracaraille

Saint-Raphaël
Bois Neuf
Mathurin
Bouyaha
San-Yago

Fort-Liberté
Dumas
Bayaha
Loiseau
Madeleine

Perches
Haut des Perches
Bas des Perches

Ferrier
 Bas Maribahoux

Capotille
Capotille
Lamine

Mont-Organisé
Savanette
Bois Poux

Ouanaminthe
Haut Maribahoux
Acul des Pins
Savane Longue
Savane au Lait
Gens de Nantes

Caracol
Champin
Glaudine ou "Jacquesil"

Sainte-Suzanne
Foulon
Bois Blanc
Cotelette
Sarazin
Moka Neuf
Fond Bleu

Terrier-Rouge
Fond Blanc
Grand Bassin

Trou-du-Nord
Garcin
Roucou
Roche Plate

Carice
Bois Camelle
Rose Bonite

Mombin-Crochu
Sans Souci
Bois-Laurence

Vallières
Palmistes
Ecrevisse ou Grosse Roche
Corosse

Baie-de-Henne
Citerne Rémy
Dos d'Ane
Réserve ou Ti Paradis
L'Estère Dere

Bombardopolis
Plate Forme
Forges
Plaine d'Orange

Jean-Rabel
Lacoma
Guinaudée
Vieille Hatte
La Montagne
Dessources
Grande Source
Diondion

Môle-Saint-Nicolas
Côtes-de-Fer
Mare-Rouge
Damé

Bassin-Bleu
La Plate
Carreau Datty
Haut des Moustiques

Chansolme
Chansolme
Beauvoi

La Tortue
Pointe des Oiseaux
Mare Rouge

Port-de-Paix
Baudin
Lapointe
Aubert
Mahotière
Bas des Moustiques
La Corne

Anse-à-Foleur
Bas de Sainte Anne
Mayance
Côtes de Fer

Saint-Louis-du-Nord
Rivière des Nègres
Derourvay
Granges
Rivière de Barre
Bonneau
Lafague (Chamoise)

Arcahaie
Boucassin
Fonds Baptiste
Vases
Montrouis
Délice
Matheux

Cabaret
Boucassin
Source Matelas
Fonds des Blancs (Casale)

Cornillon
Plaine Céleste
Bois Pin
Génipailler

Croix-des-Bouquets
Varreux
Petit Bois
Belle Fontaine
Crochus
Orangers

Fonds-Verrettes
Fonds-Verrettes

Ganthier
Galette Chambon
Balan
Fond Parisien
Mare Roseaux
Pays Pourri

Thomazeau
Grande Plaine
Trou d'Eau
Crochus

Anse-à-Galets
Palma
Petite Source
Grande Source
Grand Lagon
Picmy
Petite-Anse

Pointe-à-Raquette
La Source
Grand Vide
Trou Louis
Pointe-à-Raquette
Gros Mangle

Grand-Goâve
Tête-à-Boeuf
 Moussambé
Grande Colline
Gérard

Léogâne
Dessources
Petite Rivière
Grande Rivière
Fond de Boudin
Palmiste à Vin
Orangers
Parques
Beauséjour
Citronniers
Fond d'Oie
Gros Morne
Cormiers
Petit Harpon

Petit-Goâve
Bino
Delatre
Trou Chouchou
Fond Arabie
Trou Canari
Platons
Palmes
Sèche
Fourques

Carrefour
Morne Chandelle
Platon Dufréné
Taïfer
Procy
Coupeau
Bouvier
Lavalle
Berly
Bizoton
Thor
Rivière Froide
Malanga
Corail Thor

Delmas
St Martin

Gressier
Morne à Bateau
Chandelle
Petit Boucan

Kenscoff
Nouvelle Touraine
Bongars
Sourcailles
Belle Fontaine
Grand Fond

Pétion-Ville
Montagne Noire
Aux Cadets
Etang du Jonc
Bellevue la Montagne
Bellevue Chardonnière

Tabarre
Bellevue

Cité Soleil
Varreux

Port-au-Prince
Turgeau
l'Hôpital
Martissant
Fontamara

Bainet
Brésilienne
Trou Mahot
La Vallée de Bainet
Haut Grandou
Bas de Grandou
Bas de Lacroix
Bras Gauche
Oranger
Bas des Gris Gris

Côtes-de-Fer
Gris Gris
Labiche
Bras Gauche
Amazone
Boucan Bélier
Jamais Vu

Anse-à-Pitres
Boucan Guillaume
Bois d'Orme

Belle-Anse
Bais d'Orange
Mabriole
Callumette
Corail Lamothe
Bel Air
Pichon
Mapou

Grand-Gosier
Colline des Chênes ou Bodarie

Thiotte
Thiotte
Pot de Chambre

Cayes-Jacmel
Normande
Gaillard
Haut Cap Rouge
Fond Melon Michineau

Jacmel
Bas Cap Rouge
Fond Melon (Selles)
Cochon Gras
La Gosseline
Marbial
Montagne La Voute
Grande Rivière de Jacmel
Bas Coq Chante
Haut Coq Chante
La Vanneau
La Montagne

La Vallée
La Vallée de Jacmel ou Muzac
La Vallée de Bainet ou Ternier
Morne à Brûler

Marigot
Corail Soult
Grande Rivière Fesles
Macary
Fond Jean Noël
Savane Dubois

Aquin
Macéan
Bellevue
Brodequin
Flamands
Mare à Coiffe
La Colline
Frangipane
Colline à Mongons
Fond-des-Blancs
Section Guirand

Cavaellon
Boileau
Martineau
Gros Marin
Mare Henri
Laroque

Saint-Louis-du-Sud
Grand Fonds
Baie Dumesle
Grenodière
Zanglais
Sucrerie Henri
Solon
Cherette
Corail-Henri

Camp-Perrin
Mersan
Champlois
Tibi Davezac

Les Cayes
Bourdet
Fonfrède
Laborde
Laurent
Mercy
Boulmier

Chantal
Fonds Palmiste
Melonière
Carrefour Canon

Île-à-Vache
Île-à-Vache

Maniche
Maniche
Dory
Melon

Torbeck
Boury
Bérault
Solon
Moreau

Les Anglais
Verone
Edelin
Cosse

Chardonnières
Randal
Dejoie
Bony

Tiburon
Blactote
Nan Sevre
Loby
Dalmette

Côteaux
Condé
Despas
Quentin

Port-à-Piment
Paricot
Balais

Roche-à-Bateaux
Beaulieu
Renaudin
Beauclos

Arniquet
Lazarre
Anse à Drick
Arniquet

Port-Salut
Barbois
Dumont

Saint-Jean-du-Sud
Tapion
Débouchette
Trichet

See also
Haiti
Departments of Haiti
Arrondissements of Haiti
List of communes of Haiti

References

External links
Haitian Postal Code
 Decree on the organization and functioning of the Communal Sections.
Population Totale, Population de 18 Ans et Plus Menages Et Densites Estimes en 2009

 
Subdivisions of Haiti
Haiti 3
Haiti geography-related lists